Comitas eurina is a species of sea snail, a marine gastropod mollusc in the family Pseudomelatomidae.

Description
The length of the shell varies between 31 mm and 62 mm.

The white, slender shell has a fusiform shape  It contains  9 -10 whorls. The whorls are angulated in the middle, concave in the upper portion and convex below. The whorls are bordered below the suture with a thickened margin. The longitudinal ribs are nodose. The plicae are delicate and oblique. The body whorl contains about 16 oblique ribs that become in the lower part attenuate and then almost obsolete. The white  aperture measures about 3/7 the total length.  The outer lip is tenuous and  widely sinuate. The smooth columella is almost upright. The broad siphonal canal is oblique.

Distribution
This marine species occurs off Madagascar, Borneo and south of India at a depth of 878 m.

References

  E.A. Smith, Illustrations of the Zoology of H.M. Indian Marine Surveying Steamer Investigator. Part I: Mollusca (1897-1908)
 Cernohorsky, Walter O. "Taxonomic notes on some deep-water Turridae (Mollusca: Gastropoda) from the Malagasy Republic." Records of the Auckland Institute and Museum (1987): 123-134.

External links
 
 

eurina
Gastropods described in 1899